The IIHF World Championship Division III are an annual sports event organized by the International Ice Hockey Federation (IIHF). It was the lowest level of the IIHF World Championships until the formation of Division IV for 2020.

Organization
When the IIHF reorganized its World Championships hierarchy in 2001, which included replacing "pools" with "divisions", nations outside of the top 40 were placed in Division II Qualification, trying to qualify for participation in the following year's Division II championship. This qualifier was not deemed a championship tournament by the IIHF, but was simply used to determine the teams that would replace the two teams relegated out of the Division II championship. The bottom two nations from the 2000 Pool D championship, Luxembourg and Turkey, had been relegated and were slated to compete in the 2001 Division II Qualification, against other nations attempting to reach the 2002 Division II championship. When no other nations submitted their names to enter the 2001 qualifier, there was no need for Luxembourg and Turkey to meet, and both were promoted to Division II for 2002. Three teams met in the last, 2002, Division II Qualification.

In 2003, the Division II Qualification was officially replaced by the Division III Championship, with the winner of the tournament now being declared a champion, and the top two finishers still earning promotion to the following year's Division II Championship, to be replaced in Division III by the two teams relegated down from Division II.

In 2011, the IIHF allowed eight teams, rather than the previous year's six, to compete. The teams were divided into two groups, with the winner of each group declared co-champion and promoted to the following year's Division II tournament. While Division III returned to a six team competition in 2012, reorganization of the Division II system meant that only the champion of Division III was promoted, replacing the single team from Division II Group B that was relegated.

In 2013, the IIHF again had eight teams interested in contesting the Division III Championship. The decision was made to hold a four team qualifier, with the bottom two teams from 2012 plus two new invitees, to determine two teams to qualify for that year's Division III Championship. As with the earlier Division II Qualifications, the 2013 Division III Qualification was not a championship. The Division III Championship did not have this preliminary qualifier after the 2013 event.

In 2018, the IIHF reintroduced the Division III Qualification, but used it to determine a single team that would be invited to compete in the following year's Division III Championship, replacing the team relegated out of Division III – a variation from the 2013 Division III Qualification. This process was repeated in 2019.

Results
From 2003 until 2011, the Division III champion and the second-place finisher were promoted to Division II, replacing the two teams from Division II that were relegated to the Division III. From 2012 until 2017, only the Division III champion was promoted, to Division II Group B. From 2003 to 2010, and again from 2012 to 2016, no teams were relegated from Division III; the 2012 exception, noted above, was the IIHF holding a four team qualifier with the previous year's bottom two teams and two new invitees. By 2017, the demand from teams wishing to compete had grown to the point where the bottom team of 2017 was relegated to the newly introduced 2018 Division III Qualification, where the top qualifier earned a spot in the following year's Division III championship. The Division III Qualification was expanded in 2019, and interest had grown enough that a new Division IV Championship, rather than qualifiers, was added for 2020.  In addition, the Division III Championship was expanded to two groups for 2020.

Pool D

Champions (1987–2000)

^ – In 1992, 1994, and 1995, there was no Pool D. However, Pool C was divided in two tiers where the winner of 'C2' was promoted to 'C1', essentially making C2 the same as D. Accordingly, the winners (Spain, Estonia and Croatia) are listed here.

Summary of participation
29 championships
In 2010, the two four-team tournaments were played, this charts ranks them together assigning gold silver and bronze to the nations who ranked 41st, 42nd, and 43rd overall.
The Division III teams (2019) are ranked one to twelve, with this chart assessing gold, silver, and bronze to the nations who ranked 41st, 42nd, and 43rd overall.

Note 1. Commonly known as Taiwan.
Note 2. Known then as the Federal Republic of Yugoslavia.
Note 3. Andorra also hosted one tournament.

See also
Ice Hockey World Championships
IIHF World Championship Division I
IIHF World Championship Division II

References

External links
2019 IIHF Championship Program